Willi Alfred Boelcke was a German Economic and Social Historian, journalist, prolific author, essayist and retired university professor.   The focus of his research and output has been on Germany during the nineteenth and twentieth centuries.

Life 
Willi Alfred Boelcke was born in Berlin-Lankwitz, a suburb in the southern part of the Berlin conurbation.   He grew up in the Berlin area.   His father was a businessman-entrepreneur.   After successful completion of his school career he attended, starting in 1949, both the recently rebranded Humboldt University in the Soviet occupation zone/East Berlin and its recently inaugurated rival institution in the U.S. occupation zone / West Berlin.  He studied History, Germanistics, Economics and Jurisprudence, graduating with his first degree in 1953.

His doctorate, from the Humboldt University, and received in return for work on the "feudal overlordship in Upper Lusatia with a particular focus on economic, social and legal history in the manorial villages of East Elbia during the seventeenth and eighteenth centuries", followed just two years later.   He then completed a training for work with the senior archives service and worked in a management position with the (East) German National Archives Department in Potsdam.   During the later 1950s he was able to access and make a thorough study of the detailed records of the daily meetings that Joseph Goebbels conducted with his top ministry officials during the twelve Hitler years.   After Boelcke left the Archives Service and Potsdam in 1959 and crossed to the west this research would provide material for a number of books.

Between 1959 and 1962 Boelcke was in receipt of a research scholarship for the Bonn-based German Research Foundation ("Deutsche Forschungsgemeinschaft" / DFG).  During the 1950s the political administrative borders between East and West Berlin were progressively reinforced with physical barriers, and it became harder for Berliners to view their city as a single entity.   Nevertheless, until the sudden appearance in August 1961 of the Berlin Wall it was not impossible for East Germans to cross over to West Berlin and from there to make their way to a new life in West Germany in pursuit of greater freedom and prosperity.   Between 1953 and 1961 several million East Germans did just that, leaving behind them an intensifying labour shortage.   At some point between 1959 and (probably) 1961, Willi Alfred Boelcke became one of the intra-German emigrants.   Sources are silent as to the extent and duration of his debriefing.   In 1967 he received his habilitation (higher university degree) from the University of Stuttgart-Hohenheim.   His degree topic this time was "Constitutional changes and economic structures" covering the medieval and modern periods, taking examples from the traditionally aristocratically ruled central German lands covering approximately the modern territories identified during much of the twentieth century as Thuringia and Saxony.  Other things being equal, the habilitation opened the way to a lifelong career in the West German universities sector.   He accepted a professorship as  Economic and Social Historian at the University of Stuttgart-Hohenheim in 1969 and remained in the post for more than a quarter of a century, until 1994.

Works 
Willi Boelcke's academic work is summarised in his published books and articles, of which there are more than 100, including 20 books.   Their scope can be classified into four distinct  fields:

  The history of Middle Germany
  The history of Baden-Württemberg
  The economic history - principally of Germany - of the nineteenth and twentieth centuries
  Historical dimensions of propaganda and mass media

Output (selection)

References 

1929 births
2022 deaths
People from Berlin
Social historians
Economic historians
German opinion journalists
Academic staff of the University of Hohenheim